Isaiah Dunn Clawson (March 30, 1822 – October 9, 1879) was an American Opposition Party / Republican Party politician who represented New Jersey's 1st congressional district in the United States House of Representatives from 1855 to 1859.

Born in Woodstown, New Jersey on March 30, 1822, Clawson attended Delaware College, (Newark, Delaware) and Lafayette College Easton, Pennsylvania, and graduated from Princeton College in 1840 and from the University of Pennsylvania School of Medicine in 1843. He commenced the practice of medicine in Woodstown. He served as a member of the New Jersey General Assembly in 1854.

He was elected as an Opposition Party candidate to the Thirty-fourth Congress and reelected as a Republican to the Thirty-fifth Congress, serving in office from March 4, 1855 to March 3, 1859, but was not a candidate for renomination in 1858.

After leaving Congress, he resumed the practice of medicine in Woodstown, where he died on October 9, 1879. Interment in the Baptist Cemetery.

External links

Isaiah Dunn Clawson at The Political Graveyard

1822 births
1879 deaths
People from Woodstown, New Jersey
Opposition Party members of the United States House of Representatives from New Jersey
Republican Party members of the United States House of Representatives from New Jersey
Republican Party members of the New Jersey General Assembly
Politicians from Salem County, New Jersey
Lafayette College alumni
Princeton University alumni
Perelman School of Medicine at the University of Pennsylvania alumni